Chen Linglong (born 25 November 1993) is a Chinese taekwondo practitioner. He is a silver medalist at the Asian Games and the Asian Indoor and Martial Arts Games. He is also a gold medalist at the Asian Taekwondo Championships.

In 2014, he won the silver medal in the men's 87 kg event at the 2014 Asian Games held in Incheon, South Korea.

In 2017, he won the silver medal in the men's −80 kg event at the 2017 Asian Indoor and Martial Arts Games held in Ashgabat, Turkmenistan. In 2018, he won the gold medal in the men's 80 kg event at the 2018 Asian Taekwondo Championships held in Ho Chi Minh City, Vietnam. In the same year, he also competed in the men's 80 kg at the 2018 Asian Games in Jakarta, Indonesia without winning a medal. He was eliminated in his second match by Saleh Al-Sharabaty of Jordan.

References

External links 
 

Living people
1993 births
Place of birth missing (living people)
Chinese male taekwondo practitioners
Asian Games silver medalists for China
Asian Games medalists in taekwondo
Medalists at the 2014 Asian Games
Taekwondo practitioners at the 2014 Asian Games
Taekwondo practitioners at the 2018 Asian Games
Asian Taekwondo Championships medalists
21st-century Chinese people